Roderick MacLeish (January 15, 1926 – July 1, 2006) was an American journalist and writer.  Born in Bryn Mawr, Pennsylvania, he grew up in the Chicago suburbs and graduated from the University of Chicago.  MacLeish was news director for WBZ radio in Boston in the early 1950s, then helped start the London and Washington, DC, bureaus of Westinghouse Broadcasting, where he was a chief commentator. He later was a commentator for CBS News, National Public Radio, and The Christian Science Monitor. His published books include both nonfiction and fiction. MacLeish was the nephew of poet Archibald MacLeish.  Attorney Eric MacLeish is his son.  He died in Washington, DC, at the age of 80.

Bibliography
 A Time of Fear (fiction, 1957)
 The Sun Stood Still: Israel and the Arabs at War (nonfiction, 1967)
 The Guilty Bystander (essays, 1971)
 A City on the River (fiction, 1973)
 Carnaby Rex (paperback title: The Man Who Wasn't There) (fiction, 1976)
 The First Book of Eppe (fiction, 1980)
 Prince Ombra (fantasy fiction, 1982)
 Crossing at Ivalo (fiction, 1990)

Sources
 Adam Bernstein, "Political Commentator Rod MacLeish, 80" (obituary), The Washington Post, July 4, 2006 at B07.
Brandie M. Jefferson, "Roderick MacLeish, 80; in fiction and reality, lived a life of adventure" (obituary), The Boston Globe, July 3, 2006.
 "Former NPR Commentator Rod MacLeish Dies", National Public Radio, July 4, 2006.

External links

1926 births
2006 deaths
University of Chicago alumni
Westinghouse Broadcasting
The Christian Science Monitor people
NPR personalities
20th-century American novelists
American male novelists
American male essayists
20th-century American essayists
20th-century American journalists
American male journalists
20th-century American male writers